Brook Street Bureau PLC is a UK recruitment specialist for office support, light industrial and mid-level professional occupations. The company is one of the UK’s leading employment agencies. 

Founded in Mayfair in 1946 by Margery Hurst (who later got an OBE), the company also manages "B.S. Social Care", BS Homecare and BS Professional which recruits mid-high level professionals.

In 1965 Brook Street was the first employment agency to be listed on the London Stock Exchange and in 1985 it was the first to become a member of the British Quality Foundation.  This was followed in 1987 when they joined the Employers Forum on Disability. Brook Street (UK) Ltd employs more than 500 staff in almost 100 branches nationwide  and has 15,000 employer clients each year. It has 9000 temporary workers at any one time and 1000 new applicants per week. 

Brook Street is a member of the Recruitment and Employment Confederation, a lobby group for the interests of British employment agencies.

See also
UK agency worker law
Temporary worker
British labour law

Notes

External links
Brook Street's website
 BS Social Care website www.bssocialcare.co.uk

Temporary employment agencies
1946 establishments in the United Kingdom
Business services companies established in 1946
Employment agencies of the United Kingdom